Walk the Line is a 2005 American biographical musical romantic drama film directed by James Mangold. The screenplay, written by Mangold and Gill Dennis, is based on two autobiographies authored by singer-songwriter Johnny Cash. The film follows Cash's early life, his romance with June Carter, his ascent in the country music scene, and his struggle with drug addiction. It stars Joaquin Phoenix as Cash, Reese Witherspoon as Carter, Ginnifer Goodwin as Cash's first wife Vivian Liberto, and Robert Patrick as Cash's father.

Walk the Line premiered at the Telluride Film Festival on September 4, 2005, and was theatrically released by 20th Century Fox on November 18. The film received positive reviews and grossed $187 million on a $28 million budget. It received five nominations at the 78th Academy Awards: Best Actress (for Witherspoon, which she won), Best Actor (for Phoenix), Best Sound, Best Costume Design, and Best Film Editing.

Accolades

References

External links
 

Lists of accolades by film